Minotaur is a 2006 horror film, directed by Jonathan English. It stars Tom Hardy, Tony Todd, Ingrid Pitt and Rutger Hauer. It was filmed in Luxembourg, and is a loose retelling of the Greek myth of Theseus and the Minotaur.

Plot
In the Minoan Bronze Age, a shadow looms over the village of Thena. Every three years, under King Deucalion's order, eight youths are taken from the village to the capital of the Minoans. There, they are placed in an underground labyrinth, to be sacrifices to the Minotaur, a Minoan god.

Theo, son of the village chief Cyrnan, is haunted by the loss of his beloved Fion in an earlier sacrifice. A leprous prophetess tells him that Fion still survives in the labyrinth. Against his father's wishes, Theo replaces one of the chosen sacrifices and is taken captive to the capitol with the others: Danu (Theo's best friend), Morna (Danu's love interest), Tyro (who initially resents Theo's high status), Didi (Tyro's love interest), Vena, Ziko, and Nan.

Immediately after the group are dropped into the labyrinth, the Minotaur begins hunting them, first killing Nan. The survivors are approached by Queen Raphaella, Deucalion's sister and unwilling lover, who offers them a way out. Vena does not believe her and attempts to leave the group, but is quickly killed by the Minotaur. The rest of the group escape, and Raphaella leads them to a chamber at the center of the labyrinth where a heavy wooden door leads out of the labyrinth. The monster lies there, sleeping on a pile of its victims' remains.

Raphaella had previously arranged for her servant Ramaya to open the door from the other side, but Deucalion catches the servant and executes her. The desperate group try to break open the door, but the noise wakens the Minotaur. It kills Ziko and the group scatters.

Theo, Danu, and Morna encounter a villager from a previous offering, named Turag. Turag has managed to elude the Minotaur, but has become unhinged after years of being trapped with the monster. Theo sees his beloved Fion's likely location while examining Turag's map of the labyrinth. Theo goes off alone to find her, but instead finds her corpse, lying where she was poisoned by an underground gas deposit.

Meanwhile, Tyro and Didi reach the hole in the ceiling that they were dropped through. Tyro climbs up and reaches down to pull up Didi, but the Minotaur arrives and Didi panics, loses her grip, and falls onto one of its horns. The Minotaur also corners lovers Danu and Morna; Danu sacrifices himself to save Morna.

Raphaella reaches Theo again and explains the Minotaur's origin: Her mother committed bestiality to create a living god, and gave birth to the Minotaur. As the monster grew, so did its appetite, culminating in it murdering Raphaella and Deucalion's brother. The prince's death was blamed on Theo's village, resulting in them providing human sacrifices to appease the Minotaur, ensuring Minos' survival from the sated monster. Raphaella sent the leper to find someone in the village capable of killing the Minotaur, and thus the leper lied to Theo about Fion's survival to move him to confront the Minotaur.

Theo had discovered an underground gas vent in the labyrinth near Fion's corpse. When the Minotaur prepares to kill Theo, Tyro sacrifices himself to distract it. Theo tempts the beast into attacking him, lures it to the gas vent, and makes a spark with Fion's amulet. The gas ignites and the flame engulfs that part of the labyrinth; Theo and Raphaella survive by diving into a pond of water. They emerge from the water as the flames die out, and find the monster is still alive and now even more aggressive. As the Minotaur charges at him, Theo jams one of its horns which had broken off earlier into its mouth. Injured but still enraged, the beast charges forward and collides with a rock, which drives the horn all the way through its head, finally killing it.

Theo and Raphaella, together with the remaining survivors Morna and Turag, escape the collapsing labyrinth. On the surface, they discover that the explosion under the palace collapsed it, leaving Deucalion gravely wounded. Raphaella smothers him to death. With the deaths of the Minotaur and king Deucalion, the Minoan empire dissolves, and Theo becomes a legend for killing the monster.

Cast
 Tom Hardy as Theo 
 Michelle Van Der Water as Queen Raphaella 
 Tony Todd as King Deucalion
 Lex Shrapnel as Tyro 
 Jonathan Readwin as Danu 
 Rutger Hauer as Cyrnan 
 Maimie McCoy as Morna 
 Lucy Brown as Didi 
 James Bradshaw as Ziko 
 Fiona Maclaine as Vena 
 Claire Murphy as Nan 
 Ingrid Pitt as The Sybil

Release
Minotaur was released on DVD by Lions Gate on 20 June 2006; Maple Pictures released the film in Canada the same day. It was re-released 14 months later by Brightspark on 3 September 2007.

Reception

Allmovie gave the film a negative review, calling it "highly forgettable". The reviewer, J. Wheeler, wrote that, although it had a strong first act, the film was undone by slow pacing, and an unimpressive or scary monster design.
Dread Central reviewer J. Condit rated the film three out of five, writing that "Minotaur is the sort of film that if you paid to see it in a movie theater you'd probably come out not so much disliking the film as feeling a bit underwhelmed by it. But as far as Sci-Fi Channel premieres and direct-to-DVD movies go these days, Minotaur is an above average monster movie that's definitely worth a look – if for no other reason, see ... whatever it is Tony Todd is doing here."
Digital Retribution also rated the film three out of five, calling it "fairly mediocre".
Popcorn Pictures rated the film at five out of ten, writing "Minotaur is an underwhelming experience. It's totally formulaic but somehow different. You'll feel like you've just watched something like The Relic again, but then the whole mythological spin immediately throws that out of your mind. The jury is still out."

See also
List of historical drama films
List of films based on Greco-Roman mythology
Minos
Theseus
Minotaur
Minoan civilization
Bronze Age
Knossos
Greek mythology in popular culture

References

External links

2006 films
2006 horror films
2006 fantasy films
Syfy original films
Luxembourgian horror films
Films based on European myths and legends
Films based on classical mythology
Films scored by Martin Todsharow
Films shot in Luxembourg
British horror films
German monster movies
French dark fantasy films
American horror television films
Spanish horror films
Italian horror films
American monster movies
2000s monster movies
English-language French films
English-language German films
English-language Italian films
English-language Spanish films
English-language Luxembourgian films
Minotaur
2000s English-language films
Films directed by Jonathan English
2000s American films
2000s British films
2000s French films
2000s German films